Communist insurgency in Malaysia may refer to:

 Malayan Emergency (1948–1960)
 Communist insurgency in Malaysia (1968–1989), also known as the Second Malayan Emergency